The Eel River is a  tributary of the White River in southwestern Indiana.  Via the White, Wabash, and Ohio rivers, its waters flow to the Mississippi River and the Gulf of Mexico.  The Eel River flows through Greene, Owen, Clay, and Putnam counties. It is the southern of the two rivers named Eel River within Indiana. 

The river forms in southwestern Putnam County at the confluence of Mill Creek and Big Walnut Creek. Another tributary is Mill Creek, which flows into Cagles Mill Lake, also known as Cataract Lake, before joining the Eel.

The Eel River has a mean annual discharge of 943 cubic feet per second at Bowling Green, Indiana.

See also
List of rivers of Indiana

References

External links

Rivers of Indiana
Tributaries of the Wabash River
Rivers of Greene County, Indiana
Rivers of Owen County, Indiana
Rivers of Clay County, Indiana
Rivers of Putnam County, Indiana